Gosë is a former rural municipality situated in the central plains of Albania's Western Lowlands region. It is part of Tirana County. At the 2015 local government reform it became a subdivision of the municipality Rrogozhinë. The population at the 2011 census was 4,120.
The Fortress of Bashtovë is located in Gosë Administrative Unit.

Economy
In Gosë the climate is suitable for olives grove, there is an olive oil factory.
There is a flour factory that has been restored and it dates since the Communist era in Albania.
Many bars are situated in the town center.

Tourism
Gosë administrative limit has Vilë Beach, near the mouth of Shkumbini river.

Notable people
Eugert Zhupa, cyclist.

Villages
Gosë e Madhe
Gosë e Vogël
Vilë-Bashtovë
Ballaj
Kalush

References

Administrative units of Rrogozhinë
Former municipalities in Tirana County